Laurențiu Constantin (born 12 July 1963 in Constanța) is a former Romanian rugby union player. He played as lock.

Career

Grown in the RCJ Farul Constanța youth team, along with his younger brother Ștefan he formed a lock combination that was the backbone of the club and of the Romania national team throughout the decade, winning the national title with Farul in 1986. He was also part of the Steaua squad, with which he won 5 national championship titles in 1982, 1983, 1984, 1986 and 1987.

His international debut was on 1983, during the FIRA Trophy in Bucharest, against Soviet Union and he was also called up for the Romania squad at the 1987 Rugby World Cup, where he played the three matches. His last international cap was against France, in Bucharest, on 22 June 1991.

References

External links
Laurențiu Constantin International Statistics

1963 births
Living people
Romanian rugby union players
Rugby union locks
Romania international rugby union players
Romanian expatriate rugby union players
Sportspeople from Constanța